Tachina tenebrifera is a species of fly in the genus Tachina of the family Tachinidae that is endemic to Brazil.

References

Insects described in 1853
Diptera of South America
Endemic fauna of Brazil
tenebrifera